A Mutt in a Rut is a 1959 Warner Bros. Looney Tunes animated short directed by Robert McKimson. The short was released on May 23, 1959 and features Elmer Fudd.

The story concerns Elmer's dog, "Rover", who, after watching a television show about dogs, is determined to protest how he is treated, but after going hunting, every intention to hurt or kill Elmer backfires on him...in a good way.

Plot
While Elmer goes to work for half a day one Saturday morning, Rover turns on his favourite TV show, "The Dog Lovers Hour".  The subject matter of the day deals with the relationship between dog and master, with host Carlton Canine asking Rover (rhetorically) whether he was one of those dogs who is forced to sleep in a cold doghouse while his master sleeps in his warm bed.  Also pointing out that after a dog has worn out his usefulness, often when he and his master go out hunting, "two go out...but only one comes back".  Plenty enraged by these notions, Rover throws Elmer's framed picture on the floor and stomps on it.  Then he boots Elmer in the backside when he comes home, "brings" him his slippers, deposits them in a trash can and spits on them afterwards, and then jumps up on the bed in defiance, growling at Elmer when confronted about it.  Elmer kicks him out of the house as punishment.

After some thought, Elmer concludes that Rover's erratic behaviour is due to the fact that he hasn't taken him anywhere for a long time and decides he and Rover are going to go hunting.  However, Rover is afraid to go ahead of Elmer to kick up some game, because of his fear of Canine's earlier "two go out, but only one comes back" statement he expressed on television earlier.  Despite this, Rover becomes determined to be "the one who comes back", through a series of mishaps he engineers to harm his master and guarantee his own safety.

First Rover disappears, and when Elmer wanders around looking for him, he grabs Elmer's rifle and tries to shoot him, but ends up killing a bear in a cave Elmer crosses the entrance of, prompting him to think Rover saved his life, but is unable to find him to praise him.  Rover then tries to have a mail-order animal, the "Acme Wild Cat", attack Elmer, but Rover gets attacked instead (like in Don't Give Up the Sheep). The hapless and naive Elmer sees the injured Rover and praises him for being heroic on both accounts, but Rover still isn't buying it.

In a last ditch effort, Rover plants dynamite in the ground, but it fails to detonate when he triggers it, so he pushes Elmer out of the way, then finds the loose wires, connects them, and it blows up on him.  Elmer praises him again for saving him, telling him he'll see that he gets a medal for his heroism.  Finally won over, Rover feels like a heel and stops the attempts on his master's life.

After they go home, Elmer makes the injured pet comfortable on the couch, turns on the TV and goes to get him some milk.  "The Dog Lovers Hour" comes on again, and Rover, incensed by the events of the day, further fueled by Canine's propagandism, gets off the couch and limps to the studio (as he has one hind leg in a cast).

Elmer arrives back in the living room just in time to witness Rover attacking Canine on television, as the short ends.

Home media
A Mutt in a Rut is available on the 2010 DVD Looney Tunes Super Stars' Foghorn Leghorn & Friends: Barnyard Bigmouth.

See also
 List of cartoons featuring Elmer Fudd
 Looney Tunes and Merrie Melodies filmography (1950–1959)

References

External links
 
 

Elmer Fudd films
Looney Tunes shorts
Warner Bros. Cartoons animated short films
1959 animated films
1959 short films
1959 films
Films directed by Robert McKimson
1950s Warner Bros. animated short films
Films scored by Milt Franklyn
1950s English-language films
Animated films about dogs